Oleria gunilla, the Gunilla clearwing, is a species of butterfly of the family Nymphalidae. It is found in Ecuador, Colombia and Peru.

The wingspan is about 35 mm.

Subspecies
Oleria gunilla gunilla (Brazil (Amazonas))
Oleria gunilla lota (Hewitson, 1872) (Ecuador)
Oleria gunilla lerdina (Staudinger, 1885) (Peru)
Oleria gunilla escura (Haensch, 1903) (Ecuador)
Oleria gunilla lubilerda (Haensch, 1905) (Colombia)
Oleria gunilla borilis (Haensch, 1909) (Peru)
Oleria gunilla praemona (Haensch, 1909) (Peru)
Oleria gunilla serdolis (Haensch, 1909) (Peru)

References

Ithomiini
Fauna of Brazil
Nymphalidae of South America